The Roma–Lido railway is an urban railway line connecting the Porta San Paolo Station in Rome to Lido di Ostia, Rome's seaside neighborhood.

History
A link between Rome and Ostia was necessary since the end of the nineteenth century, when the population of the coastal area began to rise dramatically.

The first project for a railway that connected Rome to its sea was proposed by Engineer Felipe Costa in 1868 and was accepted by the Papal State, which at the time ruled the whole area. For the financing of the project, 9 million pounds, at the time, had been raised by Roman nobles who had the intention of creating a private group. In 1870, with the fall of the Papal States, the project was abandoned.

Later, a tram line that would connect the small city was discussed, but it was determined that it would be of no use.

Between 1900 and the outbreak of the First World War there were many projects and the establishments of various companies. The following year the Chamber of Commerce approved a budget of 15,000 pounds for the costs of the projects and advocated the opening of a railway line on the fiftieth anniversary of the unity of Italy that would have been celebrated in 1911.

In 1909 there was a false start after an agreement with the City of Rome, a Belgian company, the S. & C. Baschwitz.

In 1913 at a public meeting it was stated that the railway was "the desire of all citizens".

Shortly after, the engineer Paolo Orlando (future commissioner to Agro Romano with Mayor Prospero Colonna ) promoted the establishment of the Company "La Marina di Roma", which proposed a standard gauge railway and electric traction. A project was developed which provided, as well as the design of the Stefer, for the terminus to be at via Annibaldi, between the Colosseum and Via Cavour. On the basis of various considerations, it was decided that the terminus would be at Porta San Paolo.

The project involved electric supply via third rail and in 1913 was finally approved by the Government. In 1915 the final draft was approved and the grant application was ratified. Simultaneously, the power, always DC (2400 V), was decided as overhead wire.

In 1916 a law was ratified by the government (no. 550 of 27/4/1916) which established the criteria for final construction and a grant of 12 864 pounds per kilometer.

The First World War put off the work, which began on December 20, 1918 .

The official ceremony for the start of the work was done a few days after the presence of King Vittorio Emanuele III. The king also laid the first stone of the future station at Ostia on December 10, 1920 .

Due to heavy pressure from the government and Benito Mussolini in person, by then head of government, the line was inaugurated on August 10, 1924. The stock left the station of Porta San Paolo and consisted of a steam locomotive Gr 910 045, four cars, a baggage car and an observation car. On board was Mussolini himself. From the day after the line was opened to the public, ten pairs of trains ran all day, travelling along the route in about 50 minutes. On 21 April 1925 the electrification and the dual track were operational, making the line finally complete and functional. The travel time was reduced to about 30 minutes.

The heyday for the railway came in the thirties, with departures every 15 minutes. The railway was one of the main causes of the expansion of Ostia and the Roman coast and quickly became the main means of transportation used by the Romans on their way to the seaside. Furthermore, in the city of Ostia was built near the Central Station. In 1941 the STEFER (Tramways and Electric Railway Company of Rome) took the place of SEFI.

The Second World War damaged Rome and Ostia between 1943 and 1944 and damaged much of the railway. The greatest damage was at Acilia towards the coast, where the railway was completely destroyed by the Germans. The service was alternately suspended and limited only to certain areas (Ostia was evacuated and isolated). The trains, however, suffered much less damage.

Immediately after the end of fighting in Rome, work began on the repair of the railway from 21 September 1944 to 24 December 1945. The station at Ostia was abandoned altogether and later demolished because of the severe damage.

After the Second World War, the strengthening and expansion of the line continued. In an effort to bring the tracks to Ostia Levante the station of the North Star and Castelfusano were made. Also in 1949 the old Central Station Ostia was demolished (in whose place is now an amusement park) and 4 June 1951 the new station was opened in Lido di Ostia. During the fifties, given the expansion of Ostia and its transformation to the favorite seaside resort by the Romans, the demand for transportation to and from the capital continued to increase. In 1955, class MR 100 trains (built 1954) were put into service and subsequently MR 200 (built 1956). The inauguration of the Rome Metro line B enabled Ostiense Magliana station to serve both the Metro and the Roma Lido line.

Later that year, the Roma Lido line was extended all the way to Termini in central Rome, the main railway station.

On 25 August 1960 the extension of the line to Christopher Columbus station was opened. This marked the completion of the work for the railway at Ostia. Also, in 1960, Tor di Valle station, near Rome's racecourse was opened. In the summer of 1972, thanks to the expansion of the neighbourhoods between Rome and Ostia, Casal Bernocchi station was opened.

Over the years that followed, the number of passengers greatly increased, thanks to the direct connection to Termini, the main interchange for the capital, which allowed the use of the Rome–Lido railway not only by tourists, but also by commuters, students and workers. Despite the large increase of users, the only increase in the rail fleet was the introduction of class MR 300 units which entered service in 1976.

In 1987 deliveries began of the six 500 series trains ordered from Fiat Ferroviaria; each train has six carriages, four motor cars and two trailers, and can carry 1,138 passengers of which 264 are seated.

On 9 September 1989, the terminus of the Rome-Lido was set back temporarily to Magliana station to allow for the modernization of Porta San Paolo.

Service
The service begins daily at 5:08 and ends at 23:30, providing up to eight trains per hour during peak time.  During the summer trains run more frequently due to increased usage of the line, mostly by tourists visiting the beach. The average travel time of the whole line is 37 minutes. At night the line is replaced by the N3 bus which runs from Piazza Venezia (instead of Pyramid / Porta S. Paolo) to Christopher Columbus.

Route
In Rome, the line uses double tracks, separated from any other rail services.

Roma - Lido has interchanges with Metro Line B at Piramide, Basilica San Paolo and EUR Magliana. Outside the Greater Rome Area, it stops in the neighbourhoods of Tor di Valle, Vitinia, Casal Bernocchi, Centro Giano, Acilia and Ostia Antica. Then, it proceeds to Ostia itself, where it stops at five stations. It terminates at Cristoforo Colombo.

Future
Proposals exist to integrate the railway into the Rome Metro as Line E; extending the line via the city centre to Jonio using existing Line B infrastructure.

References

External links
Atac official website
Map of transport in Rome

Railway lines in Lazio
Transport in Rome
Ostia (Rome)
Railway lines opened in 1924